Karl-Günther Heimsoth, also known as Karl-Guenter Heimsoth (4 December 1899, Charlottenburg – July 1934, Berlin) was a German physician, polygraph, and politician.  Heimsoth was a member of the Nazi Party and later the Communist Party of Germany.

Life and work

Early life and studies (1919 to 1924)
Karl-Günther Heimsoth was born in Charlottenburg, the son of a court clerk and bank director.  His youth was spent in Dortmund, where in June 1917 he passed his abitur, a test of maturity which was simplified temporarily because of the First World War.  He then enlisted in the Prussian Army and until the end of 1918 participated in World War I, being deployed on the Western Front - finishing with the rank of lieutenant.

In the summer semester of 1919, Heimsoth began studying medicine at the University of Tübingen.  Heimsoth continued his clinical training at the Universities of Munich, Kiel and Rostock.  At Rostock he passed his state examination to practice medicine in the spring of 1924.  During his studies, in 1920 and 1921 he participated in the Ruhr Uprising, the fights in Thuringia, and the Silesian Uprisings as a member of the Freikorps.

Between August and November 1924 Heimsoth wrote at Rostock his dissertation entitled Hetero- und Homophilie ("Hetero- and Homophilia"), which was devoted to homosexuality. With this work, Heimsoth was probably the first to introduce the term "homophilia" in sexology.

The thesis argued that in certain erotic and friendly relationships there are certain norms looked for and desired which are "the same".  This homophilia can occur both in relationships between men and between women.  In contrast, Heimsoth saw heterophilia as a relationship characterized by "the opposite"; considered well within the range of heterophilia are platonic relationships between an effeminate man and a masculine man.  His interpretations of homosexuality and male friendship were based upon previous ideas, as developed in 1903 by Otto Weininger in Geschlecht und Charakter ("Sex and Character") and in 1919 by Hans Blüher in Die Rolle der Erotik in der männlichen Gesellschaft ("The Role of Eroticism in Male Society").  Heimsoth's reflections start with Blüher's theory on the central meaning of eroticism between men to society.

From Weininger, Heimsoth took the "law of the polar union" as an impulse of the sexual union and completed it with a second "law of the homopolar union".  He basically tried to prove that a masculine man could want another masculine man, because there were esoteric and friendly connections in such a relationship which were not wanted nor looked for in the other sex, but rather in the same sex, as an opposite pole. His hypothesis was one of the first to question heteronormative assumptions and stereotypes, which seek to explain homosexuality as nothing more than a reflection of the heterosexual dynamic that looks for opposite characteristics. As such, it was pioneering in its approach to homosexuality as a sexual attraction that seeks out what is similar or identical, without any reference to the heterosexual polarity or proxies for the same in the form of 'third genders'. Male homosexuality would thus be defined by the attraction of the masculine to the masculine without any reference to the feminine or to the polarity of the male female difference. Thereby liberating the sexual orientation and attraction between homosexual males from electromagnetic analogies and other such heteronormative paradigms that try to explain all sexual attraction as being a function of polar opposites. Heimsoth's 1924 dissertation represents thus an emancipated conceptualization of same-sex attraction that is divorced from the heterosexual and from the conceptualization of homosexuality as an 'inbetween' state between the feminine and masculine.

Activist and Publicist in the Weimar Republic (1924 to 1928)
After obtaining his doctorate, Heimsoth worked at practices in the Gynecologic University Clinic of Kiel.  At the same time, he became an "activist of the first homosexual emancipation movement", but distanced himself from the Scientific-Humanitarian Committee that had formed around Magnus Hirschfeld, because he considered that the theories advocated by the Committee concerning the "third sex" were wrong, and based on a reflex or proxy for the heteronormative assumption that sexual attraction is possible only as a function of polar opposites,  even when such polar opposites are embodied within one individual as in the 'third sex'. Theories regarding the 'third sex' from which he chose to distance himself, are ultimately based on the idea that the polarity represented by heterosexuality must be universal, and as such even homosexual individuals and the homosexual orientation itself mus reproduce or emulate that polarity. Heimsoth's theory on the other hand does not rely on heterosexuality to explain homosexuality. Instead it takes homosexuality as it is, as an attraction to the same sex, without any reference to a polarity real or imagined. In his writing Freundesliebe oder Homosexualität ("Love Between Friends or Homosexuality"), published in the magazine Der Eigene by Adolf Brand in 1925, Heimsoth showed his antisemitism: "All heroic and masculine love between friends" remains, "in his idea and possibilities of understanding[,] foreign to the Jewish spirit". Male homosexuality is thus envisioned as not only heroic, but purely masculine, not only in terms of its object of attraction but also in the sexual identity and being of the man in question. In this understanding it is the masculine within the homosexual male that seeks out the same masculinity in other males as sexually attractive without any reference to an assumed internal feminine.   Heimsoth's ideal was that of a whole man, virile and Aryan.  Homoerotic friendships between men were to serve as a nexus of "obersten Machtaufgebot" (called higher power).  Heimsoth thought that he could find examples of such heroes among the soldiers of World War I and among the Freikorps environment, as can be gathered from his 1925 publication in the magazine Der Eigene: in it he asked to be sent documentation to demonstrate the "circumstances and homoerotic relations in the Kampfwagen formations and secret societies" and wanted to obtain material "about heroism, the heroic leader problem and the psyche of the volunteers, the desperate, Landsknechte, Freikorps members, and secret societies".

From 1925 to 1928 Heimsoth learned astrology from the frigate captain Friedrich Schwickert in Vienna.  Heimsoth's publication Charakter-Konstellation: Mit besonderer Berücksichtigung der Gleichgeschlechtlichkeit (1929; "Character Constellation: With Particular Reference to Homosexuality") is dedicated to Schwickert.  This work attempts to unite psychology and astrology and create a framework for determining the degree of homosexuality of a person based upon the constellation of stars at the time of his birth.

Relationship with Röhm (1928 to 1934)
In 1928 Heimsoth wrote a letter to Ernst Röhm.  Röhm, convicted of treason following his participation in the Munich Beer Hall Putsch, had quarreled with Hitler.  Excerpts from Röhm's book Geschichte eines Hochverräters, published in 1928, were read "between the lines" by Heimsoth as recognition of the author's homosexuality.  At that time a reform of Paragraph 175 was being discussed in the Reichstag, in which the Nazi Party demanded a sharper persecution of homosexuals, and apparently Heimsoth wanted to convince Röhm, a known Nazi, who would be positioned clearly against §175.  Röhm confirmed Heimsoth's assumptions:

Röhm and Heimsoth met in person in 1928.  In subsequent letters from Röhm, it can be deduced that they had conversations about very personal issues and were together at gay meeting places in Berlin.  Heimsoth subsequently deposited Röhm's letters in the safe of a lawyer.  In 1930 Röhm became head of the SA.  From April 1930, Munich prosecutors investigated Röhm for "unnatural fornication".  On 10 July 1931 the Berlin Police requisitioned Röhm's letters in a search of his house; Heimsoth was interrogated.  Towards late 1931 and early 1932, the Secretary of State for the Interior of Prussia, Wilhelm Abegg, informed the social democrat publicist Helmuth Klotz of the existence of the letters.  Along with an extensive press report, Klotz published the letters in March 1932.

At the time of the correspondence with Röhm, it appears that Heimsoth became a member of the NSDAP. According to Otto Strasser, Heimsoth was not only an active member of the Nazi Party in the following years, but a "flaming National Socialist".

Departure from the Nazi Party
In 1930 Heimsoth joined the Kampfgemeinschaft Revolutionärer Nationalsozialisten (KGRNS), a group led by Strasser who had left the NSDAP, and that same year he went on to take the "Office for the Study of Foreign Policy", besides becoming a member of the Reichsführerrat ("Council of Leaders of the Reich") of the KGRNS.  Between Strasser, who belonged to the "left" wing of the NSDAP, and Hitler there had previously been differences in the policy pursued by the latter in matters of legality.  In June 1931 Strasser warned the police about the existence of Röhm's letters.  Heimsoth dropped out of the KGRNS in August 1931; in September he called the KGRNS a "fascist government reserve" and told them that his decision was not the result of a political discussion, but was for personal reasons.

Heimsoth joined the Communist Party of Germany (KPD), led by Beppo Römer.  Heimsoth was a member of the Executive Committee (Leiko) of the Aufbruch-Arbeitskreise (AAK) focused around the magazine Aufbruch published by Römer.  The AAK was an attempt by the KPD to win over circles of intellectuals and military officers as allies in their fight against Nazism.  Heimsoth was also an informer of the political-military apparatus of the KPD, part of the party's secret service under the command of Hans Kippenberger.

After the Machtergreifung, the Nazi Seizure of Power, Heimsoth continued giving information to the KPD secret service.  A September 1933 Gestapo report indicates continued contact with Beppo Römer.  In early July 1934, Heimsoth was shot dead by an SS command in Berlin, as part of the purge carried out during the so-called Night of the Long Knives, in which Hitler got rid of political enemies both real and imagined.  Ernst Jünger later said of the murder that Heimsoth "kept a dubious practice in the Wittenbergplatz, a real pitfall.  Just like the clairvoyant Hanussen, he was full of dangerous secrets and was one of the first to be killed."

The writer Hanns Heinz Ewers used information from Heimsoth in his 1931 novel Reiter in deutscher Nacht ("Knights of the German Night"), about the Freikorps.  The character of homosexual lieutenant Detlev Hinrichsen is a tribute to Heimsoth.

Writings
 Hetero- und Homophilie. Eine neuorientierende An- und Einordnung der Erscheinungsbilder, der "Homosexualität" und der "Inversion" in Berücksichtigung der sogenannten "normalen Freundschaft" auf Grund der zwei verschiedenen erotischen Anziehungsgesetze und der bisexuellen Grundeinstellung des Mannes, Dortmund 1924. (Dissertation)
 Charakter-Konstellation. Mit besonderer Berücksichtigung der Gleichgeschlechtlichkeit, Munich 1928.
 Freikorps greift an! Militärpolitische Geschichte und Kritik der Angriffs-Unternehmen in Oberschlesien 1921, Berlin 1930.

References

Bibliography
 
 
 
 
 
 
 

1899 births
1934 deaths
20th-century Freikorps personnel
Businesspeople from Berlin
Communist Party of Germany politicians
People executed by Nazi Germany by firearm
Gay politicians
German gynaecologists
German publishers (people)
LGBT people in the Nazi Party
German LGBT politicians
LGBT physicians
German LGBT rights activists
German Army personnel of World War I
People from Berlin executed by Nazi Germany
Politicians from Dortmund
People from the Province of Westphalia
Persecution of homosexuals in Nazi Germany
Prussian Army personnel
University of Rostock alumni
Victims of the Night of the Long Knives
20th-century German LGBT people